Abacetus fulvomarginatus is a species of ground beetle in the subfamily Pterostichinae. It was described by Straneo in 1956.

References

fulvomarginatus
Beetles described in 1956